UFC Fight Night: Lewis vs. Spivak (also known as UFC Fight Night 218, UFC on ESPN+ 76 and UFC Vegas 68) was a mixed martial arts event produced by the Ultimate Fighting Championship that took place on February 4, 2023, at the UFC Apex facility in Enterprise, Nevada, part of the Las Vegas Metropolitan Area, United States.

Background
The organization originally targeted a return to Seoul in South Korea to host the event. Instead, the event was moved to the UFC Apex in Enterprise, Nevada.

A heavyweight bout between former UFC Heavyweight Championship challenger Derrick Lewis and Sergey Spivak headlined the event. The pair was previously expected to headline UFC Fight Night: Nzechukwu vs. Cuțelaba in November 2022 but while the event was in progress, Lewis was forced to withdraw due to non-COVID, non-weight cutting illness and the bout was cancelled. However, Lewis later confirmed that he had in fact contracted COVID-19.

A women's Strawweight bout between Loma Lookboonmee and Elise Reed was scheduled for the event. However, the pair was moved to 
UFC 284 for undisclosed reasons.

The four finals of the Road to UFC's second season took place at this event.

ESPN reporter Laura Sanko made her UFC color commentary debut at this event becoming the first female color commentator in the modern UFC era to call an event from the booth.

A women's flyweight bout between Kim Ji-yeon and Mandy Böhm was expected to take place at the event. However, Böhm was forced to withdraw before the event start due to illness and the bout was cancelled.

Results

Bonus awards 
The following fighters received $50,000 bonuses.
Fight of the Night: No bonus awarded.
Performance of the Night: Sergey Spivak, Anshul Jubli, Rinya Nakamura, and Tatsuro Taira

See also 

 List of UFC events
 List of current UFC fighters
 2023 in UFC

References 

UFC Fight Night
2023 in mixed martial arts
February 2023 sports events in the United States
2023 in sports in Nevada
Mixed martial arts in Las Vegas
Sports competitions in Las Vegas